Jacques Lacombe (1724–1811) was a French bookseller and lawyer.

His notable works include Encyclopediana ou Dictionnaire encyclopédique des ana (1791), one of the volumes of the Encyclopédie Méthodique. Another was Abrégé chronologique de l'histoire ancienne des empires et des républiques qui ont paru avant Jésus-Christ. Avec la notice des savans et illustres, & des remarques historiques sur le génie & les mœurs de ces anciens peuples. (1757). Most of his works were compilations.

References

Further reading
 Karl-Heinz Kuhn: Das französischsprachige Pressewesen im Herzogtum Pfalz-Zweibrücken (Trier, Univ., Diss., 1990; Reprint 2006).

1724 births
1811 deaths
French librarians
18th-century French historians
19th-century French historians
18th-century French lawyers